Rather Good Films Ltd is an independent British film production company based in London, England. The company was formed in 2013 by Daniel-Konrad Cooper.

Major productions
It has produced or co-produced eleven films, some with international partners, both short and feature films, often comedies. Four of its notable films are:
 Burn Burn Burn 2015
 Dead in a Week (Or Your Money Back) 2018
 The Reckoning 2021
 The Man In The Hat (2020). 
However the complete filmography is given below.

Filmography

References

External links
 Official site

Film production companies of the United Kingdom